Lamontichthys avacanoeiro is a species of catfish in the family Loricariidae. It is native to South America, where it occurs in the upper Tocantins River basin in Brazil. The species reaches 16 cm (6.3 inches) in standard length. Its specific name, avacanoeiro, refers to the Avá-Canoeiro people, speakers of the Avá-Canoeiro language, who inhabit the upper Tocantins basin.

References 

Loricariidae
Fish described in 2009
Catfish of South America